João Bosco de Freitas Chaves or simply Bosco (born November 14, 1974 in Escada-PE), is a retired Brazilian goalkeeper.

Career
According to Brazilian football magazine Placar, Bosco played 149 times in Campeonato Brasileiro Série A, suffered 195 goals, received 11 yellow cards and 1 red card.

Sport Club do Recife
Bosco began his career in Sport, of the city of Recife, Pernambuco (the state where Bosco was born), in 1993. He stayed in the club until 2000, when he left for Cruzeiro. He came back to Sport in 2003.

Cruzeiro Esporte Clube
Bosco moved to Cruzeiro in 2001. He stayed until 2002, when he was transferred to Portuguesa. He capped only 10 times for Cruzeiro and suffered 19 goals.

Portuguesa
Bosco stayed for a very short time in Portuguesa, in 2002. He capped 23 times for the team, and suffered 33 goals.

Fortaleza
After playing again for Sport, Bosco was sold to Fortaleza. He was the first choice goalkeeper during the 2004 season, when Fortaleza finished Série B in second place. In 2005 Fortaleza went back to the first division. In 2005, Bosco capped 33 times for Fortaleza, suffering 50 goals. He was transferred to São Paulo at the end of the year.

São Paulo
At São Paulo, Bosco was the second goalkeeper, playing in 17 games. He played an important part in the championship-winning season of 2006, as first choice keeper Rogerio Ceni was injured for lengthy periods. His last game was on November 9, 2006, against Botafogo. He played all 94 minutes and did not concede any goal in a 3-0 São Paulo win.

After retirement
On 9 January 2015, Bosco was hired as goalkeeping coach of Santa Cruz.

Honours
Sport
Campeonato Pernambucano: 1996, 1997, 1998, 1999, 2000, 2003
Copa do Nordeste: 2000

Cruzeiro
Copa Sul-Minas: 2001

Fortaleza
Campeonato Cearense: 2005

São Paulo
FIFA Club World Championship: 2005
Campeonato Brasileiro Série A: 2006, 2007, 2008

External links
 globoesporte.globo.com
 saopaulofc.net
 sambafoot
 CBF

References

1974 births
Living people
Brazilian footballers
Sport Club do Recife players
Cruzeiro Esporte Clube players
Associação Portuguesa de Desportos players
Fortaleza Esporte Clube players
São Paulo FC players
Campeonato Brasileiro Série A players
Association football goalkeepers
Campeonato Brasileiro Série B players